Chyung Eun-ju (Hangul: 정은주; born August 9, 1993) is a South Korean beauty pageant titleholder, model and student. Eun-Ju competed in multiple pageants, the most recent being Miss World Korea, where she was the second runner up. Through her placement in the competition, she served as a model for cosmetics company ISOI and represented Korea as Miss Korea in Miss World 2015.

Jung is also a student at Seoul National University double majoring in Business Administration and Spanish. She speaks four languages: English, Korean, Portuguese and Spanish. She is currently a broadcaster at Arirang TV's Showbiz Korea.

Personal life
Eun-ju was born in Korea but moved to São Paulo, Brazil when she was one as her father set out to start his own small textile business. In Brazil, she attended Escola Graduada de São Paulo, an American school, for 12 years. She then moved to Korea to study in Seoul National University.

Career

Miss Korea Brazil 2013
Jung was originally declared the winner of the Miss Korea – Brazil pageant but was allegedly dethroned as Catharina Choi, who was the first runner took her place. There have been multiple rumors surrounding her purported dethronement, including third-party pressure and bribery, but none have emerged with evidence.

Miss World Korea 2014
Jung competed in the Miss World Korea 2014 pageant and was the second runner up to Song Hwa Young, the winner of the national pageant and delegate for Korea in the Miss World 2014 competition. Jung was also awarded the Miss ISOI title, which included a one-year contract as a model for cosmetics company ISOI. She represented Korea in the Miss World 2015 pageant held in Sanya, Hainan Island, China PR.

References

External links
 

1993 births
People from Seoul
Seoul National University alumni
Living people
South Korean beauty pageant winners
Miss World 2015 delegates